Jonathan Glidden Hunton (March 14, 1781 – October 12, 1851) was an American politician who served as the ninth Governor of Maine from February 1830 to January 1831.

Early years 
Hunton was born in Unity, New Hampshire on March 14, 1781. He was educated at local schools. He later studied law.

Career 
He started his law career in Readfield, Maine. He  serving as a member of the Governor's Executive Council in 1829. Later in 1829, he ran for governorship of Maine. He was elected as a National Republican. He was in the governor's office from February 9, 1830 to January 5, 1831. During his term, he advocated the establishment of the state's first mental hospital. Hunton was unsuccessful in his re-election bid.

Later years 
After leaving the office, he served as a member of the Maine Senate and the Maine House of Representatives from 1832 to 1834. He then practiced law. The later part of his life was spent in Dixmont, Maine. He died on October 12, 1851 in Fairfield. His remains were carried to Readfield Corner Cemetery for burial.

Sources 
 Sobel, Robert and John Raimo. Biographical Directory of the Governors of the United States, 1789-1978. Greenwood Press, 1988. 
 Gravesite https://www.findagrave.com/memorial/45473914/jonathan-glidden-hunton
 A Collection of Biographical Sketches of all the Governors since the formation of the State. Prepaired under the direction of Henry Chase http://www.onlinebiographies.info/gov/me/hunton-jonathan.htm

1781 births
1851 deaths
People from Unity, New Hampshire
People from Dixmont, Maine
Maine National Republicans
Governors of Maine
Members of the Executive Council of Maine
Members of the Maine House of Representatives
Maine state senators
People from Readfield, Maine
Maine lawyers
National Republican Party state governors of the United States
19th-century American lawyers